For the predecessor of UCASS, please see Graduate School of Chinese Academy of Social Sciences

The University of Chinese Academy of Social Sciences (UCASS) is a public university for graduate education, under the direct leadership of the Chinese Academy of Social Sciences (CASS). The predecessors of UCASS are the Graduate School of Chinese Academy of Social Sciences (GUCASS), which was set up as one of the forerunners of graduate education in humanities and social sciences in China.

Gallery

See also 

 Graduate School of Chinese Academy of Social Sciences
 Chinese Academy of Social Sciences
 Shanghai Academy of Social Sciences
 Chinese Academy of Sciences
 University of the Chinese Academy of Sciences
 University of Science and Technology of China

References

External links
Official Website for University of Chinese Academy of Social Sciences (Chinese)
Official Website for University of Chinese Academy of Social Sciences (English)

University of Chinese Academy of Social Sciences
1978 establishments in China
Chinese Academy of Social Sciences
Educational institutions established in 1978
Universities and colleges in Beijing
Vice-ministerial universities in China